Andreas Schonberg Lommer (born 7 November 1991) is a Danish long-distance runner. He competed in the men's race at the 2020 World Athletics Half Marathon Championships held in Gdynia, Poland.

In 2015, he competed in the men's 1500 metres event at the Summer Universiade held in Gwangju, South Korea.

Personal bests
Outdoor
1500 metres – 3:49.64 (Watford 2015)
5000 metres – 13:58.31 (Aalborg 2020)
10,000 metres – 29:18.94 (Odense 2020)

Road
Half marathon – 1:03:52 (Barcelona 2020)
Marathon – 2:17:42 (Amsterdam 2021)

References

External links 
 

Living people
1991 births
Place of birth missing (living people)
Danish male middle-distance runners
Danish male long-distance runners
Competitors at the 2015 Summer Universiade
21st-century Danish people